Bernardo de Sousa Campos (1869 – 1930) was a Brazilian politician and lawyer.

Early life 
He was the youngest son of Jose de Sousa Campos and Maria Gertrudes de Sousa Campos, and a great-great-grandson of Barreto Leme and Sousa Siqueira, founders of Campinas.

Education 
He held a degree in Law and Social Sciences and was a prominent attorney in São Paulo. He served as a member of parliament at the State and Federal levels, acting chief of police and attorney general for the republic in the state capital.

Personal life 
Married on 8 May 1894 in São Paulo, to Eulalia Maria Pinheiro de Sousa Campos (1869–1933), from Brotas.

References

19th-century Brazilian lawyers
1869 births
1930 deaths
Members of the Chamber of Deputies (Brazil) from São Paulo